Benjamin Huger (1746 – 11 May 1779) was one of five Huger brothers from South Carolina who served in the American Revolutionary War. Huger became a close friend of La Fayette, having met him upon his arrival near Georgetown in 1777, and his son Francis Kinloch Huger had a role in getting La Fayette temporarily released from prison at Olomouc in the 1790s.
Huger was killed in an accidental friendly fire incident near Charleston, South Carolina. His grandson was the Confederate General Benjamin Huger.

References

1746 births
1779 deaths
American Revolutionary War deaths
Huguenot participants in the American Revolution
Military personnel killed by friendly fire
South Carolina militiamen in the American Revolution
South Carolina colonial people
Deaths by firearm in South Carolina